The ninth season of Law & Order: Criminal Intent premiered on the USA Network March 30, 2010, and ended on July 6, 2010.

After the two-part season premiere, Vincent D'Onofrio, Kathryn Erbe, and Eric Bogosian left the show. Bogosian's character (Capt. Daniel Ross) was killed off in the first part of the premiere. Bogosian was replaced in the cast by Mary Elizabeth Mastrantonio, playing Captain Zoe Callas. Saffron Burrows joined the cast (as Detective Serena Stevens), replacing Julianne Nicholson (who was pregnant and having a child during taping) who played Detective Megan Wheeler. Jeff Goldbum assumed the leading role.

The scene cards return in this season after three seasons.

Episodes from the ninth season of Law & Order: Criminal Intent also aired on NBC beginning Sunday, June 20 at 10:00 PM (Eastern) with repeats of those episodes airing Saturdays starting June 26 at 8:00 PM (Eastern). The episodes aired on NBC until Sunday, September 5, 2010. Bravo began airing ninth-season episodes during early morning hours on Sundays starting November 21 at 2:00 AM until 4:00 AM.

Cast

Main cast
 Vincent D'Onofrio as Detective Robert Goren (episodes 1-2)
 Kathryn Erbe as Detective Alexandra Eames (episodes 1-2)
 Jeff Goldblum as Detective Zack Nichols
 Saffron Burrows as Detective Serena Stevens (episodes 2-16)
 Eric Bogosian as Captain Daniel Ross (episode 1)
 Mary Elizabeth Mastrantonio as Captain Zoe Callas  (episodes 3-16)

Recurring cast
 Leslie Hendrix as Chief M.E. Elizabeth Rodgers

Guest stars
 Michael Gladis – "Love Sick".
 Melissa Benoist- a struggling ballerina who is initially an understudy before a colleague's murder puts her in the top spot in "Delicate" .
 Tracy Pollan – a successful and attractive magazine writer in "Traffic".
 Lorraine Bracco – "Disciple"; a case where a body discovered at a construction site bears all the hallmarks of a serial killer who was executed more than six months earlier.
 Dan Lauria, Ralph Macchio – "Inhumane Society" where a promising young boxer is derailed when authorities discover he's at the center of a dog fighting ring.
 Dan Butler – "Lost Children of the Blood" where the body of a bright young college student is found completely drained of blood.
 F. Murray Abraham – as Theodore Nichols (Nichols's father) in a case where the body of a successful real estate agent is discovered in a basement, bled out.

Episodes

{| class="wikitable plainrowheaders" style="width:99%"
|- style="color:black"
! style="background:#71AE9A;"|No. inseries
! style="background:#71AE9A;"|No. inseason
! style="background:#71AE9A;"|Title
! style="background:#71AE9A;"|Directed by
! style="background:#71AE9A;"|Written by
! style="background:#71AE9A; width:110px"| air date
! style="background:#71AE9A; width:120px"|NBC air date
! style="background:#71AE9A;"|
! style="background:#71AE9A;"|U.S. viewers(millions)

|}

References

Law & Order: Criminal Intent episodes
2010 American television seasons